The Livenka is a river in Oryol Oblast, Russia. It is a left tributary of the Bystraya Sosna. The river usually freezes over from the end of November until the end of March.

The town of Livny is situated by the river.

Main inflows
Lesnaya Livenka
Polevaya Livenka
Unnamed lake in Livensky District

References

External links
 History of the Livenka River at family-history.ru

Rivers of Oryol Oblast